Bed & Breakfast was a German boy band from Hamburg. They were founded in 1995 and became one of Germany's first and, at the time, most successful boy bands.

Personnel 
 Florian Walberg
 Kofi Ansuhenne
 Daniel Aminati (now Pro7 host)
 David Jost (now manager for Tokio Hotel)

Discography

Studio albums 
 Stay Together (1995)
 In Your Face (1996)
 The Singles Collection (1998)
 Deep In My Mind (2000) Germany released

Singles 
 "You Made Me Believe in Magic" (1995)
 "If You Were Mine" (1995)
 "Stay Together" (1995)
 "If I Could Change the World" (1996)
 "I Will Follow You" (1996)
 "Falling in Love" (1996)
 "Get It Right" (1997)
 "All I Wanna Do" (1997)
 "Deep in My Mind" (1999)

German boy bands
Musical groups from Hamburg
Musical groups established in 1995